Jealous is an album by the blues musician John Lee Hooker. Produced by Hooker, it was recorded in 1982 but was not released until 1986, when it was issued by Pausa Records. The album won a W.C. Handy award and was nominated for a Grammy. The album was reissued on CD in 1996 by Point Blank Records.

Reception

AllMusic reviewer Thom Owens stated: "While Jealous is propelled by the scarily spare stomp of Hook's guitar, it has few standout moments. Instead, it is a consistent record, with few highs or lowsit's a standard contemporary blues album, without many peaks or valleys. Jealous may be a grittier record than its successor, The Healer, but it tends to fade into the background, making it one of his more undistinguished albums".

PopMatters''' Zeth Lundy wrote: "Jealous'' was recorded with Hooker's touring band at the time, but any sparks of chemistry are doused by the thin, lifeless sound of synthetically-rendered instrumentation... the recordings themselves are devoid of warmth and pulse, or even the gritty realism of his earlier, seminal work. Here, things are polished to a sheen that's not so much nauseating as it is dull".

Track listing
All compositions credited to John Lee Hooker except where noted.
 "Jealous" – 3:28
 "Ninety Days" – 3:24
 "Early One Morning" – 4:02
 "When My First Wife Left Me" – 4:31
 "Boogie Woman" – 4:27
 "Well Well" – 4:47
 "I Didn't Know" (Chester Burnett) – 3:00
 "We'll Meet Again" (Deacon Jones, Gregory Fowler) – 3:58
 "Worried Life Blues" (Maceo Merriweather) – 2:27
 "Ninety Days (Reprise)" – 3:20

Personnel
John Lee Hooker – guitar, vocals
Bruce Kaphan (track 8), Jamie Bowers (track 2), Mike Osborn (tracks 1-7, 9 & 10) – guitar
Deacon Jones – organ
Robbie King – keyboards (track 2)
Jim Guyett (track 8), Larry Hamilton (tracks 1-7, 9 & 10) – bass
Bowen Brown (track 8), Tim Richards (tracks 1-7, 9 & 10) – drums
Alison Hogan – backing vocals (track 2)
Ian Berry – horn arrangement (track 1)

References

John Lee Hooker albums
1986 albums
Pausa Records albums